Tyler Bleyendaal (born 31 May 1990) is a New Zealand former rugby union player and current coach. Primarily a fly-half who could also play at centre, Bleyendaal played for Canterbury,  and Munster during his playing career, before he was forced to retire from rugby in May 2020 after a persistent neck injury. He returned to New Zealand and joined the  coaching team in December 2020.

Rugby career

Canterbury

Crusaders

He was a key player in the game, scoring 14 points to help the Crusaders to a 19–18 win.

Munster
On 11 May 2014, it was announced that Bleyendaal will join Irish province Munster on a three-year contract starting from 1 November 2014. Due to a neck injury, Bleyendaal didn't arrive in Munster until January 2015.

Bleyendaal made his return from the injury on 29 April 2015, starting for Munster A in their friendly against Ulster Ravens and completing 60 minutes. He made his full debut for Munster on 5 September 2015, coming off the bench against Benetton. In January 2016, Bleyendaal was ruled out for 12 weeks with a quadriceps tendon injury.

On 22 October 2016, Bleyendaal scored 16 points, including a try, and won the Man-of-the-Match award in Munster's 38–17 win against Glasgow Warriors in Round 2 of the 2016–17 European Rugby Champions Cup, a match that was his European debut for the province. On 10 December 2016, Bleyendaal scored 18 points off the tee in Munster's 38–0 win against Leicester Tigers. On 24 January 2017, it was announced that Bleyendaal had signed a contract extension.

On 3 February 2017, Bleyendaal captained Munster for the first time, leading the side in the 2016–17 Pro12 fixture against Edinburgh. On 1 April 2017, Bleyendaal scored 21 points off the kicking tee in Munster's 41–16 Champions Cup quarter-final win against Toulouse. On 4 May 2017, it was announced that Bleyendaal had won the 2016–17 Munster Rugby Senior Player of the Year award, having been nominated by his teammates alongside John Ryan and Niall Scannell. He was also named in the 2016–17 Pro12 Dream Team.

On 17 February 2018, Bleyendaal made his return from a neck injury that had prevented him from playing since Munster's Champions Cup game against Castres in October 2017, doing so when he came off the bench to replace Ian Keatley against Cardiff Blues in the 2017–18 Pro14 and kicking a late penalty to earn his side a losing bonus-point. However, ongoing symptoms of his neck injury required surgery, ruling Bleyendaal out for the remainder of the 2017–18 season.

Bleyendaal made his return to training for Munster in September 2018 and made his return to playing off the bench for Munster A on 12 October 2018, playing 30 minutes. Bleyendaal made his first senior Munster appearance since February 2018 in the provinces 2018–19 Pro14 fixture against Cheetahs, with Bleyendaal starting at inside centre and captaining the side to a 30–26 away victory. He signed a contract extension with Munster in February 2019, a deal that will see Bleyendaal remain with the province until at least June 2021. Bleyendaal earned his 50th cap for Munster in their 31–12 win against Zebre on 23 March 2019.

Bleyendaal was forced to retire from rugby with immediate effect in May 2020 due to a persistent neck injury, which was sustained while he was playing in New Zealand and recurred on multiple occasions during his time with Munster.

International
Bleyendaal captained New Zealand Under-20 to victory in the 2010 IRB Junior World Championship. He qualified for Ireland in January 2018 under World Rugby's residence rules, and as such, Bleyendaal was called up as a non-playing guest to the Ireland international camp in August 2017.

Coaching
Following his retirement due to injury, Bleyendaal returned to New Zealand and joined the  coaching setup, where former Munster player Jason Holland is head coach, in December 2020.

Honours

New Zealand
World Rugby Under 20 Championship
Winner (1): 2010

Individual
Munster Rugby Player of the Year
Winner (1): 2017

References

External links
Munster Profile
Crusaders Profile
Canterbury Profile
Pro14 Profile

Living people
1990 births
People educated at Christchurch Boys' High School
Rugby union players from Christchurch
New Zealand rugby union players
Crusaders (rugby union) players
Canterbury rugby union players
Munster Rugby players
Munster Rugby captains
New Zealand rugby union coaches
Rugby union fly-halves
Rugby union centres